Baniasuri is a village in Barisal District in the Barisal Division of southern-central Bangladesh. A British government employee lived in Baniasuri named Syed Ali Talukder. He worked in the settlement office at Rangpur, Dhaka. His son, Mokbul Hossain Talukder, was very well-known. During the Bangladesh Liberation War in 1971, he gave shelter to many Hindus, as well as depositing their gold and other precious belongings which he returned after the war.

References

Populated places in Barisal District